Qaderabad (also Romanized as Qāderābād; also known as Qal‘eh-ye Hendū) is a village in Dasht-e Taybad Rural District, Miyan Velayat District, Taybad County, Razavi Khorasan Province, Iran. At the 2006 census, its population was 107, in 27 families.

References 

Populated places in Taybad County